Kerala Industrial Infrastructure Development Corporation (KINFRA) is a government agency under the government of the Indian state of Kerala headquartered in Thiruvananthapuram. It undertakes development of industrial estates to nurture industrialization in the state. Dr. G. C. Gopala Pillai, the former CMD of FACT, Ernakulam was at its helm for the first 12 years and was instrumental in the growth of KINFRA as an industrial facilitator in the state of Kerala.
It is now led by S. Ramnath, a protégé of Dr. Pillai.

KINFRA plans to set up an industrial park, Kera Park, at Kodakara in Thrissur district. Land acquisition is under way, and the company is awaiting clearances.

Since its inception, KINFRA has mainly identified itself with land acquisition and development of industrial infrastructure in the form of parks, townships and zones. With the objective of boosting industrial growth, KINFRA has promoted the concept of theme parks, which have been set up for the exclusive growth and development of chosen and specified industrial sectors. Some of the theme parks already implemented by KINFRA include food processing parks, an apparel park, a film and video park, an export promotion industrial park, an information technology and electronics park as well as a herbal and ayurveda park.

The government has given special emphasis to promotion of the food processing industry due to the enormous development potential in the sector. In line with this policy, two food processing parks have already been set up by KINFRA, one at Kakkanchery in Malappuram district and the other at Mazhuvannur in Ernakulam district. KINFRA also has plans to develop a spices park at Idukki for the processing of spices.

Besides these, KINFRA has also set up small industries parks under the Integrated Infrastructure Development Scheme of the Government of India, catering exclusively to small scale industrial units in growing sectors in the state. Such small industries parks have been set up by KINFRA at Thiruvananthapuram, Ernakulam, Thrissur, Wayanad and Kasaragod districts. Another park of its kind is being developed by KINFRA at Kunnamthanam in Pathanamthitta district.

KINFRA Parks

Thiruvananthapuram 

 KINFRA Film and Video Park, Kazhakkoottam
 KINFRA Apparel Park, Menamkulam
 KINFRA Global Ayurveda Village, Thonnakkal

Kollam 

 KINFRA Industrial Park, Piravanthoor

Pathanamthitta 

 KINFRA Industrial Park, Adoor
 KINFRA Industrial Park, Kunnamthanam

Alappuzha 

 Seafood Park India Limited (Joint venture), Aroor

Kottayam 

 No footprint as of now, need to have proposals & projects

Idukki 

 No footprint as of now, need to have proposals & projects

Ernakulam 

 Export Promotion Industrial Park, Kakkanad
 Hi-Tech Park, Kalamassery
 Industrial Park, Mazhuvannur
 Rubber Park (Joint venture), Irapuram

Thrissur 

 Industrial Park, Koratty

Palakkad 

 Defense Park, Ottappalam
 Industrial Park, Ottappalam
 Mega Food Park, Kanjikode
 Integrated Industrial & Textile Park, Kanjikode
 WISE Park (Joint venture), Kanjikode
 BEML Limited

Malappuram 

 Techno-Industrial Park, Kakkancherry

Kozhikode 

 No footprint as of now, need to have proposals & projects

Wayanad 

 Industrial Park, Kalpetta

Kannur 

 Textile Center, Taliparamba
 Industrial Park, Thalassery
 Indian Coast Guard Academy, Azhikkal
 Industrial Park, Mattannur
 Industrial Growth Centre, Kuthuparamba

Kasaragod 

 Industrial Park, Seethangoli
 Hindustan Aeronautics Limited

References

External links
Report from 2005 (pdf)

Economy of Kerala
State agencies of Kerala
Infrastructure in India
State industrial development corporations of India
Government agencies with year of establishment missing